The Universities and Colleges of Luzon Athletic Association (UCLAA), is a sports league that have member school teams from the Luzon area.

History
The league opened its first season on  November 25, 2008 with competition in men’s and juniors basketball and women’s volleyball. Two new members joined the second season of the Universities and Colleges of Luzon Athletic Association (UCLAA) which opened on  November 20, 2009. Manuel L. Quezon University, which topped the pre-season basketball tournament in September, and Central Colleges of the Philippines bring to nine the total number of squads in the league that cater to all Luzon-based schools.

Initiated by inaugural season host Saint Francis of Assisi College System (SFAC), National College of Business and Arts (NCBA), Olivarez College-Tagaytay (OC-Tagaytay) and the Pamantasan ng Lungsod ng Muntinlupa (PLMUN), the UCLAA aims to raise sports consciousness and promote excellence in sports competition among the youth enrolled in colleges and universities.

Season 8 was formally opened on December 7, 2015 at the Marikina Sports Complex. Collegio de San Lorenzo was this season's host. Basketball and Volleyball were the primary sports of the season.

In 2016, UCLAA merged with the National Capital Region Athletic Association to become the NCR-UCL Athletic Association. The merger however lasted for only one season.

Member Schools
As of Season 8 (2015–16):
NCR
PATTS College of Aeronautics
Colegio de San Lorenzo
De Ocampo Memorial College
National College of Business and Arts
Saint Francis of Assisi College System
Technological Institute of the Philippines(only played in volleyball)

CALABARZON
Philippine Nautical and Technological College
Asian Institute of Maritime Studies

Former members

UP Los Banos and Colegio De Santa Monica will not be participating in Season 2.

External links
Gameface.ph: Universities and Colleges of Luzon Athletic Association

2008 establishments in the Philippines
Student sport in the Philippines
Sports leagues established in 2008
Sports in Metro Manila
Sports in Cavite
Sports in Laguna (province)